I Guess This Is Goodbye may refer to:
I Guess This Is Goodbye (album), an album in The Emo Diaries series
"I Guess This Is Goodbye" (Desperate Housewives), an episode of Desperate Housewives

See also
"This Is Goodbye", a song by Killswitch Engage from Killswitch Engage (2009 album)